CJSC Dobrolet Airlines was a cargo airline based in Moscow, Russia. It was established in 1992.

Fleet 

On 10 May 2007 one of the Ilyushin Il-76 cargo aircraft (registration EX-093), was destroyed by fire at Pointe Noire Airport, Republic of Congo.

References

Defunct airlines of Russia
Airlines established in 1992
Companies based in Moscow